María Paz Ferrari (born September 12, 1973) is a field hockey player from Argentina, who won the silver medal with the national women's hockey team at the 2000 Summer Olympics in Sydney, the Champions Trophy in 2001 and the World Cup in 2002.

References

External links
 
 

1973 births
Living people
Argentine female field hockey players
Las Leonas players
Olympic field hockey players of Argentina
Field hockey players at the 2000 Summer Olympics
Olympic silver medalists for Argentina
Place of birth missing (living people)
Olympic medalists in field hockey
Medalists at the 2000 Summer Olympics
Pan American Games gold medalists for Argentina
Pan American Games medalists in field hockey
Field hockey players at the 1991 Pan American Games
Field hockey players at the 2003 Pan American Games
Medalists at the 1991 Pan American Games
Medalists at the 2003 Pan American Games
20th-century Argentine women